Zdětín is name of several locations in the Czech Republic:

 village Zdětín in Central Bohemian Region (Mladá Boleslav District)
 village Zdětín in Olomouc Region (Prostějov District)